David Leigh Colvin (January 28, 1880 in Charleston, South Carolina– September 7, 1959) was an American politician and member of the Prohibition Party and the Law Preservation Party.

He spent most of his life in New York, where he was an historian and a temperance society executive.  He attended the American Temperance University and Ohio Wesleyan University before going on to study law at the University of California, Berkeley, University of Chicago, and Columbia University.

He ran for U.S. Senator from New York in 1916 and 1932, for Mayor of New York City in 1917, for Vice President of the United States in 1920, for U.S. Representative from New York in 1922, and for President of the United States in 1936. Colvin was Chairman of the Prohibition National Committee from 1926 to 1932.

See also
Temperance organizations

References

1880 births
1959 deaths
Columbia Law School alumni
Law Preservation Party politicians
New York (state) Prohibitionists
Ohio Wesleyan University alumni
People from Clark County, Ohio
Politicians from New York City
Prohibition Party (United States) presidential nominees
UC Berkeley School of Law alumni
University of Chicago Law School alumni
Candidates in the 1936 United States presidential election
20th-century American politicians
1920 United States vice-presidential candidates
Activists from Ohio
Activists from New York (state)